Life Is a Grand... is the only full-length release from multi-instrumentalist, songwriter, composer Henry Badowski.

Track listing
All tracks composed by Henry Badowski; except where indicated
"My Face" 3:20 
"Henry's in Love" 3:09 
"Swimming With The Fish in the Sea" 4:46 
"The Inside Out" 3:27 
"Life Is a Grand" 3:44 
"Silver Trees" 3:34 
"This Was Meant To Be" 3:50 
"Anywhere Else" (Badowski, James Stevenson) 3:54 
"Baby, Sign Here With Me" 3:50 
"Rampant" 4:09

Personnel
Henry Badowski - voice, saxophones, bass, keyboards, percussion 
James Stevenson - guitar, bass 
Aleksander Kolkowski - violins 
Dave Berk - drums (uncredited)
Technical
Simon Smart, Wally Brill - engineer
Michael Ross - art direction, design
Andrew Douglas - photography

References
 

1981 debut albums
Henry Badowski albums
A&M Records albums